Summer Light (French: Lumière d'été)  is a 1943 French drama film directed by Jean Grémillon and starring Madeleine Renaud, Pierre Brasseur and Madeleine Robinson.

It was shot at the Victorine Studios in Nice and on location at Soursac on the Dordogne. The film's sets were designed by the art director André Barsacq.

Cast 
 Madeleine Renaud as Cricri
 Pierre Brasseur as Roland
 Madeleine Robinson as Michèle
 Paul Bernard as Patrice Le Verdier
 Georges Marchal as Julien
 Léonce Corne as Tonton
 Charles Blavette as Vincent
 Jane Marken as Louise Martinet 
 Henri Pons as Amédée
 Gérard Lecomte as 	Dany
 Marcel Lévesque as Monsieur Louis
 Raymond Aimos as Ernest

References

Bibliography
 Crisp, Colin. French Cinema—A Critical Filmography: Volume 2, 1940–1958. Indiana University Press, 2015.

External links 

Films directed by Jean Grémillon
1943 drama films
French drama films
1943 films
1940s French-language films
French black-and-white films
Films shot at Victorine Studios
1940s French films